Denis Watson is a former Northern Irish unionist politician who was a Member of the Northern Ireland Assembly (MLA) for Upper Bann from 1998 to 2003.

Watson worked as a financial consultant and became the Grand Master of the County Armagh Orange Lodge. He was elected to the Northern Ireland Assembly in 1998 as an independent Unionist representing Upper Bann. With two other anti-agreement Unionists, he formed the United Unionist Coalition, and was registered as its leader.

In 2000, Watson joined the Democratic Unionist Party (DUP), but  he remains the officially registered leader of the United Unionist Coalition. In 2001, he failed to be elected as a DUP candidate for Craigavon Borough Council. He also failed to retain his Assembly seat in 2003.  As of November 2012 he remains County Grand Master of County Armagh.

References

External links
The Northern Ireland Assembly

Year of birth missing (living people)
Living people
Democratic Unionist Party politicians
Northern Ireland MLAs 1998–2003
Independent members of the Northern Ireland Assembly